Septem may refer to:

 Ceuta, for which Septem is an ancient name, derived from the seven hills surrounding it, known as the seven brothers
 7 (number) , 
 Septem, a 2011 album by Black Flame

See also
 Septum
 September